Luka Bogdan (born 26 March 1996) is a Croatian professional footballer who plays as a defender for  club Ternana, on loan from Salernitana.

Club career
In July 2018, Bogdan joined Livorno.

On 31 January 2022, Bogdan moved on loan to Ternana, with an option to buy. On 23 July 2022, the loan was renewed for the 2022–23 season, with an obligation to buy.

References

External links

PrvaLiga profile 

1996 births
Living people
Footballers from Split, Croatia
Association football defenders
Croatian footballers
Croatia youth international footballers
Croatia under-21 international footballers
Croatian Football League players
FC Red Bull Salzburg players
HB Køge players
NK Zavrč players
NK Krka players
L.R. Vicenza players
Catania S.S.D. players
U.S. Livorno 1915 players
U.S. Salernitana 1919 players
Ternana Calcio players
Danish 1st Division players
Slovenian PrvaLiga players
Serie A players
Serie B players
Serie C players
Croatian expatriate footballers
Croatian expatriate sportspeople in Denmark
Expatriate men's footballers in Denmark
Croatian expatriate sportspeople in Slovenia
Expatriate footballers in Slovenia
Croatian expatriate sportspeople in Italy
Expatriate footballers in Italy